The 2011 Northern Kentucky River Monsters season was the first season for the Ultimate Indoor Football League (UIFL) franchise. Announced as a startup team for the newly formed Ultimate Indoor Football League in 2010, the team was purchased by Jill Chitwood from the UIFL in February 2011. Just a week before the season began, team General Manager, Jared Lorenzen, relieved himself of his duties as general manager, and became the quarterback for the franchise. In the River Monsters first ever game they defeated the Canton Cougars by a score of 63–41. With a Week 9 win over the Saginaw Sting, the River Monsters had clinched a postseason berth in their first season, clinching home field advantage throughout the playoffs. After wrapping up the season, the UIFL had discovered that the River Monsters had been paying their players over the league's salary cap. The UIFL stripped the River Monsters of the #1 seed and made them the #4 seed, taking away the River Monster's chance to earn playoff money. The River Monster now traveled to Saginaw, Michigan to play the Sting, where the Sting upset the River Monsters 48–47. On June 6, 2011, it was announced that the UIFL and the River Monsters mutually agreed to part ways, leaving the team free to join another league. However, the UIFL had a lease agreement with the arena, which hampered the likelihood the River Monsters would play in Highland Heights in 2012. The team had been mentioned as a charter member Stadius Football Association, but that league never got off the ground.

Offseason

2011 draft board

Schedule
Key:

Regular season

Postseason schedule

Standings

Final roster

References

Northern Kentucky River Monsters
Northern Kentucky River Monsters
Northern Kentucky River Monsters